Der Leihopa was an Austrian television series by the Austrian Broadcasting Corporation, which was broadcast from 1985 to 1989 as a family series. Starting in January 1986, it was broadcast by Bavarian television.

History 
The show's first episode aired on September 9, 1985. There were twenty-six episodes that aired from 1985 to 1989, spanning over four seasons.

Cast

See also 
 List of Austrian television series

External links

References 

Austrian television series
1985 Austrian television series debuts
1989 Austrian television series endings
1980s Austrian television series
German-language television shows
ORF (broadcaster) original programming